Cullulleraine is a locality on the Sturt Highway in northwestern Victoria, Australia,  west of Mildura and  north of Werrimull.

The local business Golden Grain Flour Mills Pty Ltd is a major employer in the rural community.

The Cullulleraine Post Office opened on 17 November 1924.

References

External links

Towns in Victoria (Australia)
Populated places on the Murray River
Mallee (Victoria)